The Iturranduz Dam was a Roman buttress dam in Navarra, Spain. It consisted of two dams, one dating to the 2nd, the other to the 3rd or 4th century AD.

See also 
 List of Roman dams and reservoirs
 Roman architecture
 Roman engineering

Notes

References

Further reading 
 
 

Roman dams in Spain
Buttress dams in Spain
Buildings and structures in Navarre